Naamkarann is an Indian drama television series which premiered 12 September 2016 on Star Plus. Inspired by the 1998 Bollywood film Zakhm, it was based on the life of filmmaker Mahesh Bhatt.

The show initially starred child actor Arsheen Naamdaar as Avni Ayesha, besides Viraf Patel, Barkha Sengupta and Reema Lagoo from September 2016 to March 2017. It then took a fifteen year-leap and focused on Avni Ayesha (Aditi Rathore) and Neil Khanna (Zain Imam). In May 2017, Ragini Shah replaced Reema Lagoo due to the latter's death. The show ended on 2 June 2018 completing 536 episodes.

Plot
9 year-old Avni Ayesha lives with her mother, Ayesha Haider. Avni's father, famous filmmaker Ashish Mehta, meets them in secret because of his mother, Dayawanti, a religious yet corrupt Hindu woman. She hates Ayesha as she is a Muslim and rejects Avni at every step. Ashish is forced to marry Neela Parikh, who befriends with Avni and stands up against Dayawanti.

Later, Ayesha delivers a son, Aman. Dayawanti kills Ayesha takes Aman (but later changes his Aman's to Anmol), framing Avni for Ayesha's death. Ashish too believes Dayawanti and gets Avni arrested. Neela bails her out and leaves with her, divorcing Ashish. Dayawanti tricks Avni and shoots her, who is later saved by Neela. Avni is presumed to be dead.

15 years later
Avni is now grown up under the name Ananya Verma and lives with Neela. ACP Neil Khanna is recruited to find out her identity. Avni meets her childhood friend, Ali, who is now a café owner and Neil's best friend. Neil's marriage is fixed with Avni's cousin, Riya. Soon, Ali finds out that Ananya is Avni and helps her. Meanwhile, Avni's brother, Anmol is grown into a spoiled brat and troubles Avni and Neela.

Later, Neil finds that Ananya is in fact Avni. Avni marries Neil to save him from Mehtas'. Eventually, Neil develops a soft corner for Avni and learns about Avni's childhood from Neela. It's revealed that Ashish has found truth about Ayesha's death, but is killed by his brother, Ketan while confronting Dayawanti. Avni, Neil and Neela expose Dayawanti and Ketan, who are arrested. Anmol realizes Dayawanti's truth and reforms himself. However, Dayawanti returns and tries to kill Avni, but is killed by Anmol, who is arrested. Avni forgives Anmol.

Neil's ex-fiancée, Juhi returns and informs him about their illegitimate daughter, Mishti; who is being held captive by Vidyut. Avni rescues Mishti and bonds with her. It is then revealed that Mishti is Vidyut's daughter. Juhi is shot to death and Avni is arrested for Juhi's death.
 
6 months later, Avni is releases from prison and learns combat skills. Neil manages to get Vidyut to confess that Avni is innocent. Neela is shot to death saving Neil from his father, Prakash who was intoxicated by Vidyut. Avni is heartbroken over Neela's death. Later, Avni and Neil consummate their marriage. Vidyut threatens Avni to marry him to save Prakash. Avni burns Vidyut's house and escapes with Mishti, making everyone believe that they are dead.

10 years later
Neil has quits his job as a police inspector and becomes a radio jockey. Avni has changed her name to Nilanjana and dedicates her life to the well-being of illegitimate children in an orphanage, named Sukoon house. She takes care of Mishti and her son, Mowgli with other orphaned children. Mishti is an aspiring singer and an ardent fan of actor Karan Kapoor. Mishti and Karan eventually fall in love, and get married.

Avni decides to leave the city with Mowgli so that Neil can start a new life with Mitali. Neil and Khannas find about Mowgli's truth. Mitali advices Neil to live with Avni and Mowgli. Finally, Avni and Neil reunite.

Cast

Main
Aditi Rathore as Avni Khanna (nee Ayesha) /Ananya Verma / Nilanjana – Neela’s adoptive daughter; Ayesha and Ashish's daughter;Aman's sister; Neil's wife; Mother of Mowgli,and adoptive mother of Mishti.Jaan didi of Sukoon house. (2017–2018)
Arsheen Naamdaar as Child Avni Ayesha (2016–2017)
Zain Imam as Neil Khanna – ACP turned radio jockey; Shweta and Prakash's son; Avni's husband; Father of Mowgli and adoptive father of Mishti. (2017–2018)
Sayantani Ghosh as Neela Parikh – Ashish's ex-wife; Avni's adoptive mother; Mowgli and Mishti's adoptive grandmother (2016–2018)
 Reema Lagoo / Ragini Shah as Dayawanti Mehta – Ashish, Ketan and Diksha's mother; Avni, Riya and Aman's grandmother (2016–2017) 
Barkha Sengupta as Ayesha "Asha" Haider – Fatima's daughter; Ashish's wife; Avni and Aman's mother; Mowgli's grandmother; Mishti's adoptive grandmother (2016-2017)
Viraf Patel as Ashish Mehta – Dayawanti's elder son; Ketan and Diksha's brother; Neela's ex-husband; Ayesha's widower; Avni and Aman's father; Mowgli's grandfather; Mishti's adoptive grandfather (2016–2017)

Recurring cast
Gulfam Khan as Fatima Banu – Ayesha's mother; Avni and Aman's grandmother (2016–2017)
Jahaan Arora as Dakhal Dayal aka DD – Neil's friend and colleague; A police officer; Sunheri's love interest (2017–2018)
Gautam Vig as Ali – Avni's childhood best friend; Neil's best friend (2017–2018)
Shubh Kalra as Child Ali (2016)
Kunwar Amarjeet Singh as Aladdin aka Kabir – Avni's friend (2016)
Anaya Soni as Hetal Mehta – Ketan's wife; Riya's mother (2016–2017)
Puru Chibber as Ketan Mehta – Dayawanti's younger son; Ashish and Diksha's brother; Riya's father (2016–2017)
Neelam Sivia as Diksha Mehta – Dayawanti's daughter; Ashish and Ketan's sister; Hansmukh's ex-wife (2016–2017)
 Vivek Madan as Hansmukh – Diksha's ex-husband (2016)
Nalini Negi as Riya Mehta – Ketan and Hetal's daughter; Avni and Aman's cousin (2017)
Palak Dey as Child Riya (2016)
Sushant Mohindru as Aman Mehta – Ayesha and Ashish's son; Avni's brother (2017)
 Sanjay Swaraj as Prakash Khanna – Harleen's son; Shweta's husband; Neil's father; Mowgli's grandfather; Mishti's adoptive grandfather (2017–2018)
Shruti Ulfat as Shweta Khanna – Prakash's wife; Neil's mother; Mowgli's grandmother; Mishti's adoptive grandmother. (2017–2018)
Neelu Kohli as Harleen Khanna – Prakash's mother; Neil's grandmother; Mowgli's great-grandmother; Mishti's adoptive great-grandmother (2017–2018)
Kabir Shah as Mowgli "Pillu" Khanna – Avni and Neil's son; Mishti's adoptive brother (2018)
Payal Bhojwani as Mishti "Saisha" Khanna Kapoor – Juhi and Vidyut's daughter; Avni and Neil's adoptive daughter; Mowgli's adoptive sister; Karan's wife (2018)
Aayesha Vindhara as Child Mishti Khanna (2017–2018)
Zaan Khan as Karan "KK' Kapoor – A film industry's superstar; Kamini and Sharad's son; Mishti's husband (2018)
 Poonampreet Bhatia as Juhi – Neil's ex-fiancée; Mishti's mother (2017)
Karam Rajpal as Vidyut Pandit – Ragini's son; Mishti's father; Avni's obsessive lover (2017–2018)
Soni Singh as Sunehri – Avni's friend and well-wisher (2017–2018)
Sana Amin Sheikh as Mitali Sharma – A police inspector; Neil's friend (2017–2018)
Prakriti Nautiyal as Tara – Avni's friend who was a prisoner earlier (2017–2018)
Pragya Nautiyal as Sitara – Avni's friend who was a prisoner earlier (2017–2018)
Jayati Bhatia as Kamini Kapoor – Sharad's wife; Karan's mother (2018)
Mohit Chauhan as Sharad Kapoor – Kamini's husband; Karan's father (2018)
Bhavesh Balchandani as Samrat – An orphan at Sukoon house (2018)
Swasti Katyal as Pinki – An orphan who lives with Avni (2018)
Pawani Sharma as Daisy – An orphan at Sukoon house (2018)
Manini Mishra as Ragini Pandit – Vidyut's mother; leader of a human trafficking racket (2017–2018)
Priya Tandon as Monica – A prisoner (2017–2018)
Karan Jagdish Singh as Avni's lawyer (2018)

Production
The show initially starred child actor Arsheen Naamdaar as Avni Ayesha, besides Viraf Patel, Barkha Sengupta and Reema Lagoo from September 2016 to March 2017. It then took a fifteen year-leap and focused on Avni Ayesha (Aditi Rathore) and Neil Khanna (Zain Imam). In May 2017, Ragini Shah replaced Reema Lagoo due to the latter's demise. The show ended on 18 May 2018 completing 463 episodes and its slot was taken by Krishna Chali London.

Soundtrack

See also
 Vishesh Films

References

External links
 Naamkarann streaming on Hotstar
 

StarPlus original programming
2016 Indian television series debuts
2018 Indian television series endings
Hindi-language television shows
Indian television soap operas
Indian drama television series
Television shows set in Mumbai
Indian television shows based on films
Live action television shows based on films